Dolphinton is a village and parish in Lanarkshire, Scotland.

The local manor belonged in the 12th century to Dolfin, elder brother of the first Earl of Dunbar. The estate was owned in various forms by the Brown family from the sixteenth till the nineteenth centuries, when it passed to the McKenzie family by marriage.

It is bordered by the parishes of Linton and Kirkurd (Peeblesshire), Walston and Dunsyre.

The Railway

The village once had two railway termini, now long since closed. The Leadburn, Linton and Dolphinton Railway was the first to reach Dolphinton; the line, from the Peebles Railway at Leadburn, opened on 4 July 1864. In 1867 the Dolphinton Branch was opened, connecting Carstairs Junction to the Leadburn line at Dolphinton.

Major Joseph Learmont
An example may partially survive of an escape or Ley Tunnel built in Covenanting times at the old house and estate of Newholm. This tunnel was built by Newholm's owner at the time, Major Joseph Learmont, a leading member of the Covenanter cause who fought at Rullion Green and Bothwell Bridge. The stone lining was eventually used to build a walled garden; it had run from a cellar to a turf dyke in mossy ground. Remains of it may have been discovered in the 1960s however details are sparse. The major was sentenced to death however partly due to his advanced age he was sent to the Bass Rock before eventual release.

References

External links
 
 Gazetteer for Scotland
 Google images
 map

Villages in South Lanarkshire